Frank Guida (May 26, 1922 – May 19, 2007) was a Sicilian-American songwriter and music producer credited with discovering Gary U.S. Bonds, whose hits, including "New Orleans" and "Quarter to Three", he produced. He was also a songwriter for Leroy Toombs. Other performers discovered by Guida include Jimmy Soul, Tommy Facenda (who gave Guida his first hit with "High School U.S.A."), Lenis Guess and Pamala Stanley.  The distinct sound he helped to create has been credited as influencing such major songwriters and producers as Bruce Springsteen and Phil Spector.  Together with musicians like the tenor saxman Gene "Daddy G" Barge, he helped establish what became known as  "the Norfolk sound". His songs have been used in such films as Mask, Mermaids and Jaded.

Biography 
Born in Palermo, he came to New York City with his family as a child.  While stationed in Trinidad during the Second World War, he fell under the influence of calypso. He relocated to Norfolk, Virginia, where he opened a record store in 1953. That store, Frankie's Got It, was located on Granby Street but has closed.  Its motto was Shakespeare's "If music be the food of love, play on!", which later became a song on a Bonds B-side.

Apart from his hits with Bonds, his most famous song is "If You Wanna Be Happy", recorded by Jimmy Soul. Australian singer, Joe Dolce, recorded a cover version of "If You Wanna Be Happy", in 1981, with a new set of Italian-themed lyrics. Guida wrote Dolce about the new version: '"If You Want to Be Happy" has got to be as good if not just a wee better than 'Shaddap You Face'. Frankly I never dreamed anyone could come up with such a great and incredibly different arrangement. Sure, the new lyrics are excellent but the whole Italo-Anglo melodic fusion is absolutely fantastic. As a hard-nosed and proud Italian-American, I do not in anyway find it offensive or demeaning. Would you believe that I am a charter member of the National Italian American Foundation and not more that two weeks ago, I informed our president in Washington, D.C., Frank Stella, that Joe Dolce's next release would be one I wrote!!'  Guida's 'live' 'party-in-the-studio' sound is thought to have influenced Phil Spector.

He owned a number of record labels, including LeMonde (distributed by Atlantic), then Legrand (distributed by Rust/Laurie) and finally SPQR (distributed by London).

Guida died in Norfolk, Virginia, in 2007.

References

External links 

Frank Guida presents Greatest Hits
Birdland Music
Legrand Records

1922 births
2007 deaths
American male composers
Musicians from Norfolk, Virginia
Record producers from Virginia
Italian emigrants to the United States
Songwriters from Virginia
American male songwriters
20th-century American composers
20th-century American male musicians